Pleurocera is a genus of freshwater snails with an operculum, aquatic gastropod mollusks in the family Pleuroceridae.

Pleurocera is the type genus of that family.

Distribution
All members of the genus Pleurocera are native to eastern North America.

Description
All of the species in this genus have thick-walled high-spired shells, and some attain a length of over 4 cm. The shape of the shell is elongate-conic or cylindrical. The sculpture of the shell is often carinate or costate. The shell of larger species sometimes develops sculpturing and a small siphonal canal or siphonal notch at the base of the aperture.

Opercula are paucispiral and corneous, but may be vestigial in some species, not completely closing the aperture.

The soft parts of the animal usually have a gray or brown coloration, commonly speckled with orange. The similar genus Juga has a seminal receptacle, but Pleurocera has no seminal receptacle.

Species
Species within the genus Pleurocera include: (brackets needs to be checked, authorities according to the IUCN Red List may be incorrect)
 Pleurocera acuta Rafinesque, 1831 - sharp hornsnail, type species of the genus Pleurocera
 Pleurocera alveare Conrad, 1834 - rugged hornsnail
 Pleurocera annulifera Conrad, 1834 - ringed hornsnail
 Pleurocera brumbyi I. Lea, 1852 - spiral hornsnail
 Pleurocera catenaria catenaria (Say, 1822)
 Pleurocera catenaria catenaria (Say, 1822) - synonyms: Pleurocera albanyensis (I. Lea, 1864), Pleurocera boykiniana (I. Lea, 1840), Pleurocera caelatura, Pleurocera christyi, Pleurocera darwini, Pleurocera interrupta (Haldeman, 1840), Pleurocera lecontiana, Pleurocera mutabilis, Pleurocera postelli, Pleurocera suturalis, Pleurocera viennaensis
 Pleurocera catenaria dislocata (Ravenel, 1834)
 Pleurocera corpulenta Anthony, 1854 - corpulent hornsnail
 Pleurocera curta Haldeman, 1841 - shortspire hornsnail
 Pleurocera foremani I. Lea, 1843 - rough hornsnail
 Pleurocera pyrenella Conrad, 1834 - skirted hornsnail
 Pleurocera showalteri I. Lea, 1862 - upland hornsnail
 Pleurocera walkeri Goodrich, 1928 - telescope hornsnail 
 Pleurocera canaliculata (Say, 1821) - Silty hornsnail, synonyms: Pleurocera nobile
Species brought into synonymy
 Pleurocera costulatum Fuchs, 1870: synonym of  † Goniochilus costulatus (Fuchs, 1870)
 Pleurocera kochii Fuchs, 1870: synonym of † Goniochilus kochii (Fuchs, 1870) 
 Pleurocera radmanesti Fuchs, 1870: synonym of  † Prososthenia radmanesti (Fuchs, 1870)

Ecology
Most species inhabit larger rivers.

Pleurocera snails are dioecious.

References

External links 
 

Pleuroceridae
Taxonomy articles created by Polbot
Taxa named by Constantine Samuel Rafinesque